Star Trek: Assignment: Earth is a five-issue limited series, written and drawn by John Byrne, based on the events in the Star Trek second-season finale, "Assignment: Earth". The series was published by IDW Publishing.

One notable story shows Gary Seven's and Roberta Lincoln's peripheral involvement in the events of a prior Star Trek episode, "Tomorrow Is Yesterday"—which, due to peculiarities of time travel, happens after "Assignment: Earth" for Seven and Roberta, but before "Assignment: Earth" for the Enterprise crew.

External links
 
 IDW Publishing page

2008 comics debuts
IDW Publishing titles
Comics based on Star Trek
Cultural depictions of Richard Nixon
Fiction set in 1968
Fiction set in 1969
Fiction set in 1970
Fiction set in 1971
Fiction set in 1972